The  is an aerial lift system in Takayama, Gifu Prefecture, Japan, and is operated by . The Meitetsu Group company also operates hotels in the area. Opened in 1970, the line climbs to the hillside of the Hida Mountains' Mount Hotaka, the third tallest mountain in Japan.

Basic data
The Shinhotaka Ropeway consists of two lines. Ropeway No. 2 is the first aerial lift in Japan to use double decker cabins.

Ropeway No. 1 

System: Aerial tramway, 3 cables
Cable length: 
Vertical interval: 
Passenger capacity per a cabin: 45
Cabins: 2
Stations: 2
Duration of one-way trip: 5 minutes

Ropeway No. 2 

System: Aerial tramway, 2 track cables and 2 haulage ropes
Cable length: 
Vertical interval: 
Passenger capacity per a cabin: 121 (double decker)
Cabins: 2
Stations: 2
Duration of one-way trip: 7 minutes

See also
List of aerial lifts in Japan

External links
 Official guide
 Official website
 

Aerial tramways in Japan
Tourist attractions in Gifu Prefecture
Meitetsu Group
1970 establishments in Japan